Sean Andrew McCann (born September 21, 1971) is the senator for the Michigan Senate's 19th district. He formerly represented the 20th senate district. He is a former member of the Michigan House of Representatives, who represented the 60th district. He is a member of the Democratic Party.

Personal life and education
McCann graduated from Western Michigan University in 1993 with a degree in political science.

Career
McCann served on the Kalamazoo, Michigan City Commission for ten years, starting in 1999. He was elected to the Michigan House in 2011.

In 2013, he proposed the creation of an independent commission to draw legislative districts in the state, in order to help prevent gerrymandering. He worked for the Kalamazoo Red Cross and the Vine Neighborhood Association.

In 2014, he ran against Republican Party nominee Margaret O'Brien and Libertarian Party nominee Lorence Wenke for the 20th district seat in the Michigan Senate. He lost to O'Brien after a recount widened from 59 votes to 61 votes.

In 2018, in a rematch, McCann defeated Margaret O'Brien with 60,523 votes to O'Brien's 48,197 votes.

References

External links
Official Senate Profile
Campaign website
Vote Smart page

1971 births
Living people
Politicians from Detroit
Politicians from Kalamazoo, Michigan
Western Michigan University alumni
Michigan city council members
Democratic Party members of the Michigan House of Representatives
Democratic Party Michigan state senators
20th-century American politicians
21st-century American politicians